Moose Creek can refer to:

Canada
Moose Creek, Ontario, a small village in the municipality of North Stormont near the cities of Cornwall and Ottawa
Rural Municipality of Moose Creek No. 33, Saskatchewan
Moose Creek (Yukon), a creek

United States
 Moose Creek, Alaska
 Moose Creek (Bearpaw River), a tributary of Bearpaw River in Alaska
 Moose Creek Township, Minnesota
 Moose Creek (Adirondack mountains), in the High Peaks Wilderness Area of New York State